Estaing is a commune in the Aveyron department in the Occitanie region of Southern France. In 2016, it had a population of 491. The D'Estaing family, first mentioned in writings in 1028, was one of the most powerful families of the Rouergue from the 13th to the 18th century, making the village known throughout France.

Geography

Located in the north of the Aveyron department, Estaing is considered one of the most picturesque villages in France. It one of the ten villages of Aveyron that are part of the Les Plus Beaux Villages de France association ("the most beautiful villages of France"). The village is very quiet during the winter months; it is in the summer that it shows the most signs of life. Lying at 320 metres above sea level, the winters are cool and the summers are hot and dry.

The bridge over the river Lot in Estaing has been part of the UNESCO World Heritage Site of the Routes of Santiago de Compostela in France since the site's designation in 1998. Espalion is a ten-minute drive away, while Rodez is about 50 minutes away.

Population
Population evolution since 1962:

Personality
Urbain Hémard, doctor and dentist of the bishop Georges d'Armagnac, banished from Rodez for having favoured the Ligueurs in 1589, came to find refuge in Estaing and died there on 14 October 1592.

See also
Communes of the Aveyron department

References

Communes of Aveyron
Plus Beaux Villages de France
World Heritage Sites in France
Aveyron communes articles needing translation from French Wikipedia